Zaka Siddiqi (1937–2003) was an Urdu poet and a critic of Urdu and Persian poetry.  His published works include Aamadnaama, Aaj Ki Shab Phir Sannaata, and Makaateebe Habeeb.

Life
Ghazal singer Jagjit Singh has performed two of his ghazals, Khamoshi Khud Apni Sada Ho and Jeete Rehne Ki Saza De, in his albums In Search and Face to Face, respectively.

Works
 Aamadnaama
 Aaj Ki Shab Phir Sannaata
 Makaateebe Habeeb

External links
 Makaateebe Habeeb online

1937 births
Urdu-language poets from India
2003 deaths
Indian Muslims
20th-century Indian poets
Indian male poets
20th-century Indian male writers